The district of Bagot was established in 1853, under the Union regime of 1841.

Bagot was represented by one Member at the Legislative Assembly of the Province of Canada.

See also
History of Canada
History of Quebec
Bagot Federal Electoral District
Bagot Provincial Electoral District
Politics of Canada
Politics of Quebec

Electoral districts of Canada East